The decorated running frog (Kassina decorata) is a species of frog in the family Hyperoliidae. It is endemic to Cameroon where it is known from the Bamiléké highlands and from Mount Manengouba. There is uncertainty whether it is a valid species, and it has been also considered synonym of Kassina maculosa.

This little known species has been found around lakes and in marshes in high-elevation grassland, and in flooded grassland and marshes in humid savanna.

References

decorata
Amphibians described in 1940
Endemic fauna of Cameroon
Amphibians of Cameroon
Taxa named by Fernand Angel
Taxonomy articles created by Polbot